Veness is a surname. Notable people with the surname include:

Amy Veness (1876–1960), British actress 
David Veness, British civil official
Peter Veness (1984–2012), Australian journalist